The Fasting Cure is 1911 non-fiction book on fasting by Upton Sinclair. It is a reprinting of two articles written by Sinclair which were originally published in the Cosmopolitan magazine. It also includes comments and notes to the articles, as well as extracts of articles Sinclair published in the Physical Culture magazine. The book is dedicated to Bernarr Macfadden.

Sinclair was keenly interested in health and nutrition. He experimented with various diets, and with fasting. He writes extensively about fasting in The Fasting Cure, which became bestseller. Sinclair believed that periodic fasting was important for health, saying, "I had taken several fasts of ten or twelve days' duration, with the result of a complete making over of my health". Sinclair favored a raw food diet of predominantly vegetables and nuts. For long periods of time, he was a complete vegetarian, but he also experimented with eating meat. His attitude to these matters is fully explained in the book's final chapter, "The Use of Meat".

The book makes sensational claims of fasting curing practically all diseases, including cancer, tuberculosis, asthma, syphilis, and the common cold.

Contemporary reception 
The book was condemned in The Monthly Cyclopaedia and Medical Bulletin by gastroenterologist Anthony Bessler, who described treating many sickly patients who had followed the advice published in Sinclair's The Contemporary Review and Cosmopolitan Magazine articles. The accompanying article in Current Literature criticized Sinclair as a "faddist pure and simple, one whose mind is obsessed by a series of notions one after another, none resting upon any basis that can be called scientific or even sensible."

Legacy
In his book Terrors of the Table: The Curious History of Nutrition (2005), British biophysicist Walter Gratzer describes Sinclair as "the most credulous of faddists." Gratzer also writes, "In what passes for a caveat he remarks [in his book The Book of Life (1921)]: 'I have known two or three cases of people dying while they were fasting, but I feel quite certain that the fast did not cause their death.' The irony in all this farrago is that we now have good evidence for an increased life-span in rodents kept in laboratory conditions on a very low-calorie diet." Likewise, in the book Quackery: A Brief History of the Worst Ways to Cure Everything (2017), authors Lydia Kang and Nate Pedersen write, "Although modern doctors would strongly disagree with Sinclair's unsolicited medical advice, there have been some recent promising studies on the impact of fasting on mice with cancer. Human studies, however, are still lacking."

In popular culture 
Sinclair appears in T. C. Boyle's novel The Road to Wellville (1993), which is built around a historical fictionalization of John Harvey Kellogg, the inventor of Corn Flakes and the founder of the Battle Creek Sanitarium. In the book, Sinclair and his first wife, Meta, appear as patients at the Sanitarium. Later, Kellogg is outraged when he discovers that another of his patients has been fasting after reading a typescript of Sinclair's The Fasting Cure.

See also 
 Water fasting
 Hereward Carrington#Dieting
 Edward H. Dewey
 Linda Hazzard
 Otto Buchinger

References

Further reading

External links 

1911 non-fiction books
Books by Upton Sinclair
Fasting
Alternative medicine publications
Works originally published in Cosmopolitan (magazine)